Albert Otho Roger (1920–1995) better known as Bert Roger was a speedway rider from England.

Speedway career 
Roger rode in the top tier of British Speedway from 1948 to 1956, riding primarily for New Cross Rangers and West Ham Hammers. He was a leading rider in the early 1950s and finished in the top ten UK averages during the 1952 Speedway National League riding for New Cross.

He qualified for the final of the 1952 Individual Speedway World Championship but was unable to take his place due to injury.

Family
His brothers Bob Roger and Cyril Roger were both speedway riders.

References 

1920 births
1995 deaths
British speedway riders
Exeter Falcons riders
New Cross Rangers riders
West Ham Hammers riders
Poole Pirates riders
Plymouth Devils riders
People from Elham, Kent